Territory is a 2015 Russian adventure drama film written and directed by Aleksandr Melnik, a screen version of the same novel by Oleg Kuvaev. The film, like the book, is based on real events and narrates about the discovery of a grandiose gold deposit in the Far North-East of the Soviet Union. The film stars 
Konstantin Lavronenko, Grigoriy Dobrygin, Egor Beroev, Kseniya Kutepova and Yevgeny Tsyganov joining the cast.

The novel was previously adapted in the Soviet Union in 1978 by Aleksander Surin. The picture starred Donatas Banionis as Ilya Chinkov.

Plot
1960 year. The Far North-East of the Soviet Union. Geographical reference: City Magadan and Village Pevek. After the war, the country needs gold, but the Territory continues to give only tin. Territory management is closed. Chief engineer, the legendary Ilya Chinkov is convinced that there is gold in the Territory. He challenges the fate and for one field season it is taken to find it. Using absolute authority, Chinkov organizes searches for gold in the Territory, despite the absence of direct instructions from the leadership and the sad fate of his predecessor, whose career was destroyed due to the fact that no gold was found in the Territory.

Cast

Production 
The production of film titles took place from May to October 2014. The video sequence is based on materials provided by the Department of the History of Geology, the Vernadsky State Geological Museum, the Russian Academy of Sciences (RAS).

Release
On February 11, 2015, a preliminary screening for the press, artists, and the invited geological community of Russia took place in the Kremlin Palace of Congresses. The show was held on a 30-meter screen in 4K format.

Territory was released in the Russian Federation on April 16, 2015 by VolgaFilm.

Reception

Box office
The film failed at the box office - with a budget of half a billion rubles, six times less was collected.

References

External links 
 
 

2015 films
2010s Russian-language films
2010s adventure drama films
Russian adventure drama films
Films set in the Soviet Union
Films shot in Russia
2015 drama films